Salagunda, is a village in the Sindhanur taluk of Raichur district in Karnataka state, India. Salagunda was the capital of the Sindha dynasty. Salagunda is 20 km South to the taluka headquarters Sindhanur and 5 km from Karnataka State Highway 19. Nearest towns are Siruguppa and Karatagi.

Demographics
 India census, Salgunda had a population of 6560 with 3233 males and 3327 females.

See also
 Somalapur
 Mukkunda
 Roudkunda
 Maski
 Kanakagiri
 Sindhanur
 Raichur
 Districts of Karnataka

References

External links
 http://Raichur.nic.in/

Villages in Raichur district